Thomas Coulbeck (4 July 1885 – 10 August 1955) was an English professional footballer who played as an inside forward.

References

1885 births
1955 deaths
English footballers
Association football inside forwards
Cleethorpes Town F.C. players
Grimsby Town F.C. players
Gainsborough Trinity F.C. players
Haycroft Rovers F.C. players
English Football League players